"Be Alone No More" is the debut single by British R&B vocal quartet Another Level, released on 16 February 1998. It is from their eponymous debut album (1998), and features American rapper Jay-Z. The song was written by Steven Dubin, Andrea Martin and Ivan Matias. In 1999, it was released a second time in remix form together with a cover of the Simply Red song "Holding Back the Years". The two releases peaked at number six and number eleven in the UK respectively. Several UK garage remixes were also released, such as the 'Dubmonsters Mix' and 'Another Groove Mix'. The latter is a mashup with Double 99's "RipGroove".

Critical reception
Claudia Connell from News of the World declared "Be Alone No More" "a superb debut single which blends hip-hop and R&B with sophisticated, soulful harmonies."

Track listing
"Be Alone No More" (C&J Radio Mix) – 4:02 	
"Be Alone No More" (Blacksmith Skate & Roll Mix) – 5:28 	
"Be Alone No More" (Another Groove Mix) – 6:10 	
"Be Alone No More" (Blacksmith's R'n'B Radio Rub) – 6:21

Personnel
Steven Dubin – songwriting
Andrea Martin – songwriting
Ivan Matias – songwriting
Cutfather & Joe – production
Joe Belmaati – keyboard, programming, engineering
Tue Röh – Rhodes piano
Bernard Löhr – engineering
Ramus – engineering assistant

Charts

Weekly charts

Year-end charts

Certifications

Philip George and Anton Powers version

In 2015, "Be Alone No More" was covered by British producers Philip George and Anton Powers, retitled "Alone No More". It debuted at number 4 on the UK Singles Chart, number 1 on the UK Dance Singles Chart and number 1 on the Scottish Singles Chart. It was released on 2 October 2015 as a digital download in the UK through 3 Beat Records.

Background
Powers had been toying with the idea of remixing "Be Alone No More" for several years before meeting George who suggested it be a good idea. They then covered the song, with George producing the single and Powers singing the lyrics.

Music video
A music video to accompany the release of "Alone No More" was first released onto YouTube on 10 September 2015 at a total length of three minutes and three seconds.

Track listings

Charts

Certifications

Release history

References

1997 songs
1998 debut singles
Songs written by Andrea Martin (musician)
Another Level (band) songs
Jay-Z songs
2015 singles
Philip George (DJ) songs
Anton Powers songs
Songs written by Ivan Matias
Number-one singles in Scotland
Song recordings produced by Cutfather & Joe
3 Beat Records singles